Comanche 4 is a video game developed and published by NovaLogic for Windows in 2001.

Gameplay
Comanche 4 is a game in which the player can pilot the Comanche RAH-66.

Reception

Computer Gaming Worlds Jeff Lackey summarized the game as: "A standard but well-done shoot-'em-up action/arcade game."

GameSpot's Bruce Geryk said that "Whether or not you like your flight sims to be in any way realistic, Comanche 4 does a good job of disguising the fact that you're playing a flying version of Serious Sam. The excellent graphical effects, nonstop action, and nominal helicopter content make this a great game to fire up for a while just as a change of pace. Comanche 4 is a good time in small doses, and while you'll quickly get tired of the homogenous gameplay, you'll probably end up jumping back in sooner than you think. That is, if you like to see stuff blow up."

GameSpy's Alan Lackey summarized that: "NovaLogic has successfully blended the fast-paced characteristics of the action game with the technical nature of the flight sim in Comanche 4. Throw in some amazing graphics and entertaining mission design and you have a fun, action-packed title that should appeal to trigger-happy pilots everywhere."

IGN's Ivan Sulic approved the change of graphics engine: "One thing which can be of no dispute is that the switch from a voxel-based rendering engine to one of next-generation powered polygonal bliss is welcome beyond measure. When played on the GeForce 3s and Radeon 8500s the game demands and deserves, Comanche shines with a technically brilliant, realistic, yet polished aesthetic sheen that immediately catapults it to the upper echelons of the PC market in terms of graphical splendor. Gone are poorly developed unrecognizable assemblages of voxels, and in are excessive polygon counts, meticulous detail, sharp texturing, and jaw dropping particle effects.".

See also
Enemy Engaged: RAH-66 Comanche vs. KA-52 Hokum

References

External links
 (archived)

2001 video games
Combat flight simulators
Helicopter video games
Multiplayer and single-player video games
NovaLogic games
Video games developed in the United States
Windows games
Windows-only games